Donny de Soet (born 17 October 1997), also known professionally as Dante Klein, is a Dutch DJ and record producer. He is best known for his collaboration with American band Cheat Codes for the single "Let Me Hold You (Turn Me On)".

Career
Klein's first single, "Ertesuppe," was released in 2014 on Spinnin' Records and was featured on Pete Tong's BBC Radio 1. His 2016 collaboration "Let Me Hold You (Turn Me On)" with Cheat Codes was a commercial success and has been awarded Gold and Platinum status in several countries. He has also released collaborations with numerous other artists, including HAILZ, Bone Thugs n Harmony, Jantine, Dylan Jagger, Feli Ferraro, and Cimo Frankel. 

Klein has performed at numerous electronic music festivals around the world, including Tomorrowland (Belgium), Ushuaïa (Ibiza), Nova Era Festival (Portugal), Sunrise Festival (Poland), Ohrid Calling (Macedonia), Sounce Parade (South Korea), and ADE (Amsterdam).

Discography

Charted singles

Other singles
Adapted from iTunes.
"Ertesuppe" (2014)
"Harder"  (2017)
"Coke & Hennessy"  (2017)
"What I Like About U"  (2017)
"Contagious"  (2018)
"what i like about u"  (2018)
"Nothin' On You" (2018)
"The Way I Love You"  (2018)
"Lost At Sea" (2019)
"Escape" (2019)
"Tell It to My Heart"  (2022)

Remixes
Adapted from SoundCloud.
Kim Churchill — "Window To The Sky" (2015)
Dimitri Vegas & Like Mike featuring Ne-Yo — "Higher Place" (2015)
Tobtok featuring Alex Mills — "Shelter" (2015)
Yellow Claw featuring Yade Lauren — "Invitation" (2016)
Cheat Codes — "Queen Elizabeth" (2017)
CVBZ — "Be Like You" (2017)

References

1995 births
Deep house musicians
Tropical house musicians
Musicians from Amsterdam
Living people
Dutch DJs
Dutch electronic musicians
Spinnin' Records artists
Electronic dance music DJs